The 1900–01 Cornell Big Red men's basketball team represented Cornell University during the 1900–01 college men's basketball season. The team finished with a final record of 2–4–1.

Schedule

|-

References

Cornell Big Red men's basketball seasons
Cornell
Cornell Big Red
Cornell Big Red